The 1908 Nebraska Cornhuskers football team represented the University of Nebraska as a member of the Missouri Valley Conference (MVC) during the 1908 college football season. The team was coached by second-year head coach William C. "King" Cole and played its home games at Antelope Field in Lincoln, Nebraska.

This was the final year Nebraska played home games at Antelope Field. Following the 1908 season, the university constructed Nebraska Field, located on campus adjacent to where Memorial Stadium was later built. Nebraska's all-time record at Antelope Field was 56–8–2.

Schedule

Coaching staff

Roster

Game summaries

Peru State

Sources:

Doane

Sources:

Grinnell

Sources:

at Minnesota

Sources:

Nebraska again traveled north to face powerhouse Minnesota, ending a four-game losing streak against the Golden Gophers with a goal-line stand to force a scoreless draw.

Haskell

Sources:

Iowa

Sources:

Iowa State

Sources:

Kansas

Sources:

Kansas ended Nebraska's 11-game home winning streak, NU's first loss at Antelope Field since falling to KU in 1906. After the game, Nebraska players accused Kansas of spying on team practices or otherwise improperly obtaining NU team signals, but the game result stood and gave the Jayhawks the MVIAA championship.

Wabash

Sources:

Carlisle

Sources:

For the second consecutive week, Nebraska hosted a team it would play only once in program history. The meeting was arranged to bring the heralded Jim Thorpe to Lincoln, and though Thorpe reportedly struggled, Carlisle dominated the game.

References

Nebraska
Nebraska Cornhuskers football seasons
Nebraska Cornhuskers football